{{DISPLAYTITLE:C11H12N2}}
The molecular formula C11H12N2 (molar mass: 172.23 g/mol, exact mass: 172.1000 u) may refer to:

 2-Methylnaphthalene-1,4-diamine (vitamin K6)
 Tryptoline, or tetrahydronorharmane